The FIS Cross-Country World Cup is an annual cross-country skiing competition, arranged by the International Ski Federation (FIS) since 1981. The competition was arranged unofficially between 1973 and 1981, although it received provisional recognition on the 31st FIS Congress, 29–30 April 1977 in Bariloche, Argentina.

The first World Cup races were held on 9 January 1982 and were located in Reit im Winkl, West Germany and Klingenthal, East Germany. Bill Koch of the United States and Berit Aunli of Norway were the overall winners in the first season.

Rules
Competitors attempt to achieve the most points during the season. They compete in two disciplines: Distance and Sprint. Current Distance races are mostly 10 km, 20 km, Skiathlon and 50 km for the men and women. The competitions are held with either individual start or mass start and either classic or free technique. In Sprint races, athletes are organised in heats based on their results in a prologue where the 30 fastest skiers qualify for the sprint's quarter-finals. The 12 best skiers in the quarter-finals advance to the semi-finals and the 6 best skiers in the semi-finals advance to the final. Sprint races are maximum 1.8 kilometres and are competed in either classic or free technique.

In ordinary World Cup races, 100 points are awarded to the winner, 95 for second place, 90 for third place, winding down to 1 point for 50th place. In Stage World Cup races; Tour de Ski, World Cup Final and mini-tours, 50 points are awarded to the winner, 47 for second place, 44 for third place, winding down to 1 point for 30th place. The overall winners of the Stage World Cup events are awarded 300 points for Tour de Ski victory and 200 points for an overall win in the World Cup Final or a mini-tour. The athlete with the most points at the end of the season in mid-March wins the Overall World Cup, with the trophy consisting of a 9 kilogram crystal globe. Sub-prizes are also awarded to the winners of the Sprint World Cup and the Distance World Cup, with a smaller 3.5 kg crystal globe.

Races are hosted primarily in Europe, with regular stops in the Nordic countries and Central Europe. A few races have also been held in North America and Asia. World Cup competitions have been hosted in 23 countries around the world: Austria, Bosnia and Herzegovina, Bulgaria, Canada, China, Czechoslovakia, Czech Republic, Estonia, Finland, France, Germany, Italy, Japan, Norway, Poland, Russia, Slovakia, Slovenia, Soviet Union, South Korea, Sweden, Switzerland and the United States. (Note that all World Cup races hosted in Bosnia were held when it was still part of Yugoslavia.)

Overall World Cup standings

The table below shows the three highest ranked skiers each year.

Men 

a.  Unofficial World Cup
b.  Trial World Cup

Source:

Women 

a.  Trial World Cup

Source:

With six overall World Cup titles Bjørn Dæhlie is record-holder among both men and women.

Sprint World Cup standings

Men

Women

Distance World Cup standings

Men 

a.  Arranged under the name of "Long Distance World Cup".

Women 

a.  Arranged under the name of "Long Distance World Cup".

U23 World Cup standings

Men

Women

Nations Cup 
All results of female and male athletes of a nation are counted for the Nations Cup.

World Cup title winners

Overall titles

Men

Women

Sprint titles

Men

Women

Distance titles

Men 

a.  Long Distance World Cup
b.  Middle Distance World Cup

Women 

a.  Long Distance World Cup
b.  Middle Distance World Cup

Most World Cup wins

Most successful race winners

Men

Women

With 84 victories in World Cup and total 114 including Stage World Cup wins Marit Bjørgen is record-holder among both men and women.

World Cup wins by nation 
The table below lists those nations which have won at least one individual World Cup race.

Most World Cup podiums, top 10 results and individual starts

Men's career podiums

Men's career top 10s

Men's individual starts

Women's career podiums

Women's career top 10s

Women's individual starts

Season records

Men

Victories per season

Podiums per season

Most points per season

Highest overall advantage

Women

Victories per season

Podiums per season

Most points per season

Highest overall advantage

Consecutive victories and podiums

Men

Consecutive victories

Consecutive podiums

Women

Consecutive victories

Consecutive podiums

Youngest and oldest race winners

Men's youngest winners 

Source:

Women's youngest winners 

Source:

Men's oldest winners 

Source:

Women's oldest winners 

Source:

Multi winners

Men's double winners

Women's double winners

World Cup all-time records

Men 

Sources:

Women 

Sources:

World Cup scoring system

1981/82 season to 2005/06 season 

a.  Team sprint discipline was first introduced in 1995/96 season.

2006/07 season to 2021/22

2022/2023 season 

a.  Nordic Opening is held annually since 2010/11 season.
b.  World Cup Final is held since 2007/08 season, except 2014/15, 2015/16 and 2019/20 seasons. The stages of its first edition were not counted as a Stage World Cup race, hence no World Cup points were awarded.
c.  Ski Tour 2020 was held only in 2019/20 season.
d.  Tour de Ski is held annually since 2006/07 season. World Cup points were not awarded for the stage races in its first edition.
e.  Ski Tour Canada was held only in 2015/16 season.
f.  Individual World Cup points for places in Relays and Team Sprints since 2020/21 season.

Timeline calendar

World Cup hosts

a.  As Czechoslovakia until 1992.
b.  As Soviet Union until 1991.
c.  As Yugoslavia until 1991.
d.  As Leningrad until 1991.

World Cup Finals

 2007–08 – Bormio, Italy
 2008–09 – Stockholm / Falun, Sweden
 2009–10 – Stockholm / Falun, Sweden
 2010–11 – Stockholm / Falun, Sweden
 2011–12 – Stockholm / Falun, Sweden
 2012–13 – Stockholm / Falun, Sweden
 2013–14 – Falun, Sweden
 2014–15 – not held
 2015–16 – 2016 Ski Tour Canada
 2016–17 – Quebec City, Canada
 2017–18 – Falun, Sweden
 2018–19 – Quebec City, Canada
 2019–20 – cancelled
 2020–21 – cancelled
 2021–22 – cancelled
 2022–23 – not held

See also 
Tour de Ski
FIS Nordic World Ski Championships

Footnotes

References

External links
Cross-Country at FIS-Ski.com

 
Cross-country skiing competitions
Cross-Country
Cross-Country
Skiing world competitions
Recurring sporting events established in 1981